William Evans Crow (March 10, 1870 – August 2, 1922) was an American lawyer and Republican party politician from Uniontown, Pennsylvania. He served in the Pennsylvania State Senate from 1907 until 1921, and was the body's President pro tempore in 1911. In 1921, he was appointed to the United States Senate, after Philander C. Knox died in office. Crow himself died in office less than a year after his appointment.

Biography

William Evans Crow was born on March 10, 1870, in German Township, Fayette County, Pennsylvania. He received his education from the public schools and obtained college education at the Southwestern State Normal School, from which he graduated in 1890. He also attended Waynesburg College. After college, he worked in newspaper publishing for three years until studying law and being admitted to the bar in 1895. He subsequently practised law in Uniontown, Pennsylvania, until his appointment as assistant district attorney in 1896, a position in which he served until his election as district attorney in 1898. After serving for three years, he was elected to the Pennsylvania Senate, where he served from 1907 to 1921.

Crow was appointed to the United States Senate on October 17, 1921, to fill a vacancy created by the death of Philander Knox, after which he resigned from the State Senate to assume his new role. Crow served in the U.S. Senate until his own death on August 2, 1922, at his home near Uniontown, Pennsylvania. He was interred in Uniontown Cemetery.

Crow was the father of Congressman William J. Crow.

See also
List of United States Congress members who died in office (1900–49)

References

External links
 

1870 births
1922 deaths
County district attorneys in Pennsylvania
Republican Party Pennsylvania state senators
Republican Party United States senators from Pennsylvania
Presidents pro tempore of the Pennsylvania Senate
People from Uniontown, Pennsylvania